The Bishop of Cornwall was the bishop of a diocese which existed between about 930 and 1050. Nothing is known about bishops in the post-Roman British Kingdom of Cornwall, but by the mid-ninth century Wessex was gaining control over the area, and between 833 and 870 a bishop at Dinuurrin, probably Bodmin, acknowledged the authority of the Archbishop of Canterbury. There may have been another bishop at St Germans. By the end of the century Cornwall was part of the diocese of Sherborne, and Asser may have been appointed the suffragan bishop of Devon and Cornwall around 890 before he became bishop of the whole diocese. When he died in 909, Sherborne was divided into three dioceses, of which Devon and Cornwall were one. In Æthelstan's reign (924-939) there was a further division with the establishment of a separate Cornish diocese based at St Germans. Later bishops of Cornwall were sometimes referred to as the bishops of St Germans. In 1050, the bishoprics of Crediton and of Cornwall were merged and the Episcopal see was transferred to Exeter.

List of bishops of Cornwall
Abbreviation: bet. = between; all the dates are very uncertain.

References

Further reading

Dioceses established in the 9th century
 
Christianity in Cornwall